Checkmate (often shortened to mate) is any game position in chess and other chess-like games in which a player's king is in check (threatened with ) and there is no possible escape. Checkmating the opponent wins the game.

In chess, the king is never actually captured—the player loses as soon as the player's king is checkmated. In formal games, it is usually considered good etiquette to resign an inevitably lost game before being checkmated.

If a player is not in check but has no legal move, then it is stalemate, and the game immediately ends in a draw. A checkmating move is recorded in algebraic notation using the hash symbol "#", for example: 34.Qg3#.

Examples
A checkmate may occur in as few as two moves on one side with all of the pieces still on the board (as in Fool's mate, in the opening phase of the game), in a middlegame position (as in the 1956 game called the Game of the Century between Donald Byrne and Bobby Fischer), or after many moves with as few as three pieces in an endgame position.

Etymology

The term checkmate is, according to the Barnhart Etymological Dictionary, an alteration of the Persian phrase "shāh māt" which means "the King is helpless". Persian "māt" applies to the king but in Sanskrit "māta", also pronounced "māt", applied to his kingdom "traversed, measured across, and meted out" thoroughly by his opponent; "māta" is the past participle of "mā" verbal root. Others maintain that it means "the King is dead", as chess reached Europe via the Arab world, and Arabic māta means "died" or "is dead". 
Moghadam traced the etymology of the word mate. It comes from a Persian verb mandan, meaning "to remain", which is cognate with the Latin word  and the Greek menō (which means "I remain"). It means "remained" in the sense of "abandoned" and the formal translation is "surprised", in the military sense of "ambushed". "Shāh" is the Persian word for the monarch. Players would announce "Shāh" when the king was in check. "Māt" is a Persian adjective for "at a loss", "helpless", or "defeated".  So the king is in mate when he is ambushed, at a loss, helpless, defeated, or abandoned to his fate.

In modern Persian, the word mate depicts a person who is frozen, open-mouthed, staring, confused and unresponsive.  The words "stupefied" or "stunned" bear close correlation.  So a possible alternative would be to interpret mate as "unable to respond".  A king being in mate (shah-mat) then means a king is unable to respond, which would correspond to there being no response that a player's king can make to the opponent's final move. This interpretation is much closer to the original intent of the game being not to kill a king but to leave him with no viable response other than surrender, which better matches the origin story detailed in the Shahnameh.

In modern parlance, the term checkmate is a metaphor for an irrefutable and strategic victory.

History
In early Sanskrit chess ( 500–700), the king could be  and this ended the game.  The Persians (c. 700–800) introduced the idea of warning that the king was under attack (announcing check in modern terminology).  This was done to avoid the early and accidental end of a game.  Later the Persians added the additional rule that a king could not be moved into check or left in check. As a result, the king could not be captured, and checkmate was the only decisive way of ending a game.

Before about 1600, the game could also be won by capturing all of the opponent's pieces, leaving just a bare king. This style of play is now called annihilation or robado. In Medieval times, players began to consider it nobler to win by checkmate, so annihilation became a half-win for a while, until it was abandoned.

Two major pieces

Two  (queens or rooks) can easily  checkmate on the edge of the board using a technique known as the ladder checkmate. In the illustration, White checkmates by forcing the Black king to the edge, one row at a time. The ladder checkmate can be used to checkmate with two rooks, two queens, or a rook and a queen.

Basic checkmates
There are four fundamental checkmates when one side has only their king and the other side has only the minimum  needed to force checkmate, i.e. (1) one queen, (2) one rook, (3) two bishops on opposite-colored squares, or (4) a bishop and a knight. The king must help in accomplishing all of these checkmates.  If the winning side has more material, checkmates are easier.

The checkmate with the queen is the most common, and easiest to achieve. It often occurs after a pawn has queened. A checkmate with the rook is also common, but a checkmate with two bishops or with a bishop and knight occurs infrequently. The two-bishop checkmate is fairly easy to accomplish, but the bishop and knight checkmate is difficult and requires precision.

King and queen

The first two diagrams show representatives of the basic checkmate positions with a queen, which can occur on any edge of the board. Naturally, the exact position can vary from the diagram.
In the first of the checkmate positions, the queen is directly in front of the opposing king and the white king is protecting its queen.

 
With the side with the queen to move, checkmate can be forced in at most ten moves from any starting position, with optimal play by both sides, but usually fewer moves are required. In positions in which a pawn has just promoted to a queen, at most nine moves are required.

In the position diagrammed, White checkmates easily by confining the black king to a rectangle and shrinking the rectangle to  the king to the edge of the board:

1. Qf6 Kd5 2. Qe7 Kd4 3. Kc2 Kd5 4. Kc3 Kc6 5. Kc4 Kb6 6. Qd7 Ka6 7. Qb5+ Ka7 8. Kc5 Ka8 9. Kc6 Ka7 10. Qb7

Avoid stalemate

The winning side must be careful to not stalemate the opposing king, whereas the defender would like to get into such a position. There are two general types of stalemate positions that can occur, which the stronger side must avoid.

King and rook

 

The first diagram shows the basic checkmate position with a rook, which can occur on any edge of the board.  The black king can be on any square on the edge of the board, the white king is in opposition to it, and the rook can check from any square on the rank or file (assuming that it cannot be captured). The second diagram shows a slightly different position where the kings are not in opposition but the defending king must be in a corner.

With the side with the rook to move, checkmate can be forced in at most sixteen moves from any starting position.  Again, see Wikibooks – Chess/The Endgame for a demonstration of how the king and rook versus king mate is achieved.

In the third diagram position, White checkmates by confining the black king to a rectangle and shrinking the rectangle to force the king to the edge of the board:

1. Kd3+ Kd5 2. Re4 Kd6 3. Kc4 Kc6 4. Re6+ Kc7 5. Kc5 Kd7 6. Kd5 Kc7 7. Rd6 Kb7 8. Rc6 Ka7 9. Kc5 Kb7 10. Kb5 Ka7 11. Rb6 Ka8 12. Kc6 Ka7 13. Kc7 Ka8 14. Ra6# (second checkmate position, rotated).

Avoid stalemate

There are two stalemate patterns:

King and two bishops 

Here are the two basic checkmate positions with two bishops (on opposite-colored squares), which can occur in any corner. (Two or more bishops of the same color, which could occur because of pawn underpromotion, cannot checkmate.)

The first is a checkmate in the corner. The second position is a checkmate on a side square next to the corner square (this position can theoretically occur anywhere along an edge, but can only be forced adjacent to a corner). With the side with the bishops to move, checkmate can be forced in at most nineteen moves, except in some very rare positions (0.03% of the possible positions).

It is not too difficult for two bishops to force checkmate, with the aid of their king. Two principles apply:

In the position from Seirawan, White wins by first forcing the black king to the side of the board, then to a corner, and then checkmates. It can be any side of the board and any corner. The process is:

1. Ke2 Ke4 (Black tries to keep his king near the center) 2. Be3 Ke5 (forcing the king back, which is done often) 3. Kd3 Kd5 4. Bd4 Ke6 5. Ke4 Kd6 (Black tries a different approach to stay near the center) 6. Bc4 (White has a fine position; the bishops are centralized and the king is active) 6... Kc6 (Black avoids going toward the side) 7. Ke5 Kd7 (Black is trying to avoid the a8-corner) 8. Bd5 (keeping the black king off c6) 8... Kc7 9. Bc5 Kd7 10. Bd6! (an important move that forces the king to the edge of the board) 10... Ke8 (Black is still avoiding the corner) 11. Ke6 (now the black king cannot get off the edge of the board) 11... Kd8 12. Bc6 (forcing the king toward the corner) 12... Kc8 (Black's king is confined to c8 and d8; the white king must cover a7 and b7) 13. Kd5 (13. Ke7 is stalemate) 13... Kd8 14. Kc5 Kc8 15. Kb6 Kd8 (now White must allow the king to move into the corner) 16. Bc5 Kc8 17. Be7! (an important move that forces the king toward the corner) 17... Kb8 18. Bd7! (the same principle as the previous move) 18... Ka8 19. Bd8 (White must make a move that gives up a tempo; this move is such a move, along with Bc5, Bf8, Be6, or Ka6) 19... Kb8 20. Bc7+ Ka8 21. Bc6# (as the first diagram in this section).

Note that this is not the shortest forced checkmate from this position. Müller and Lamprecht give a fifteen-move solution; however, it contains an inaccurate move by Black (according to endgame tablebases).

Avoid stalemate

One example of a stalemate is this position, where 1. Kb6 (marked with the x) would be stalemate.

King, bishop and knight

Also, the checkmate can be forced only in a corner that the bishop controls.

Two basic checkmate positions are shown with a bishop and a knight, or the bishop and knight checkmate. The first position is a checkmate by the bishop, with the black king in the corner. The bishop can be on other squares along the diagonal, the white king and knight have to be on squares that attack g8 and h7. The second position is a checkmate by the knight, with the black king on a side square next to the corner. The knight can be on other squares that check the black king. The white king must be on a square to protect the bishop and cover a square not covered by the knight.

With the side with the bishop and knight to move, checkmate can be forced in at most thirty-three moves from any starting position, except those in which the defending king is initially forking the bishop and knight and it is not possible to defend both. However, the mating process requires accurate play, since a few errors could result in a draw either by the fifty-move rule or stalemate.

Opinions differ as to whether or not a player should learn this checkmate procedure.  James Howell omits the checkmate with two bishops in his book because it rarely occurs but includes the bishop and knight checkmate.  Howell says that he has had it three times (always on the defending side) and that it occurs more often than the checkmate with two bishops.  On the other hand, Jeremy Silman includes the checkmate with two bishops but not the bishop plus knight checkmate because he has had it only once and his friend John Watson has never had it. Silman says: "... mastering it would take a significant chunk of time.  Should the chess hopeful really spend many of his precious hours he's put aside for chess study learning an endgame he will achieve (at most) only once or twice in his lifetime?"

Avoid stalemate

This position is an example of a stalemate, from the end of a 1966 endgame study by A. H. Branton. White has just moved 1. Na3+? If Black moves 1... But after any bishop move, the position is a stalemate.

Common checkmates

Back-rank mate

A back-rank checkmate is a checkmate delivered by a rook or queen along a back rank (that is, the row on which the pieces [not pawns] stand at the start of the game) in which the mated king is unable to move up the board because the king is blocked by friendly pieces (usually pawns) on the second rank. An example of a back-rank checkmate is shown in the diagram. It is also known as the corridor mate.

Scholar's mate

Scholar's Mate (also known as the four-move checkmate) is the checkmate achieved by the moves:

1. e4 e5 2. Qh5 Nc6 3. Bc4 Nf6?? 4. Qxf7#

The moves might be played in a different order or in slight variation, but the basic idea is the same: the queen and bishop combine in a simple mating attack on f7 (or f2 if Black is performing the mate). There are also other ways to checkmate in four moves.

Fool's mate

Fool's Mate, also known as the "Two-Move Checkmate", is the quickest possible checkmate. A prime example consists of the moves:

1. f3 e5 2. g4 Qh4#

resulting in the position shown. (The pattern can have slight variations, for example White might play f4 instead of f3 or move the g-pawn first, and Black might play ...e6 instead of ...e5.)

Smothered mate

A smothered mate is a checkmate delivered by a knight in which the mated king is unable to move because it is surrounded (or smothered) by its own pieces.

The mate is usually seen in a corner of the board, since fewer pieces are needed to surround the king there. The most common form of smothered mate is seen in the adjacent diagram. The knight on f7 delivers mate to the king on h8 which is prevented from escaping the check by the rook on g8 and the pawns on g7 and h7. Similarly, White can be mated with the white king on h1 and the knight on f2. Analogous mates on a1 and a8 are rarer, because  castling is more common as it safely places the king closer to the corner compared to  castling.

Rare checkmates

In some rare positions it is possible to force checkmate with a king and knight versus a king and pawn.

Stamma's mate

In the diagram showing Stamma's mate (named for Philipp Stamma), White to move wins:
 1. Nb4+ Ka1
 2. Kc1 a2
 3. Nc2#

White also wins if Black is to move first:
 1... Ka1
 2. Nc1 a2
 3. Nb3#

This checkmate occurred in Jesús Nogueiras–Maikel Gongora, 2001 Cuban Championship (see diagram), which proceeded:

 81. Kc2 Ka1
 82. Nc5 Ka2
If 82...a2 then 83.Nb3#.
 83. Nd3
Reaching the position in the first diagram, with Black to move.
 83... Ka1
 84. Nc1 
Black resigned here; play would have continued 84...a2 85.Nb3#.

A similar position with the knight on d2 is more than 500 years old, identified as "Partito n. 23" by Luca Pacioli, in his MS De ludo scachorum (Latin for "The game of chess"), dated 1498 and recently reprinted (Gli scacchi) by Aboca Museum Edizioni.

1. Nf3 Ka1
2. Nd4 Ka2
3. Ne2 Ka1
4. Nc1 a2
5. Nb3#

Unusual mates
There are also positions in which a king and a knight can checkmate a king and a bishop, knight, or rook; or a king and a bishop can checkmate a king with a bishop on the other color of squares or with a knight, but the checkmate cannot be forced if there is no other material on the board (see the diagrams for some examples). Nevertheless, it keeps these  combinations from being ruled a draw because of "insufficient mating material" or "impossibility of checkmate" under the FIDE rules of chess. The U.S. Chess Federation rules are different.  In a typical position with a  versus a minor piece, a player would be able to claim a draw if they have a limited amount of time left.

Two and three knights
Two knights

 

 

It is impossible to force checkmate with a king and two knights, although checkmate positions are possible (see the first diagram). In the second diagram, if Black plays 1... Ka8 White can checkmate with 2. Nbc7#, but Black can play 1... Kc8 and escape the threat. The defender's task is easy – he simply has to avoid moving into a position in which he can be checkmated on the next move, and he always has another move available in such situations.

In the third diagram, one knight is guarding c1, leaving the other knight to try to checkmate.  After 1. Ndc3+ Ka1, White needs to get the knight on e2 to c2.  But if White plays , Black is stalemated.

Under some circumstances, two knights and a king can force checkmate against a king and pawn (or rarely more pawns). The winning plan, quite difficult to execute in practice, is to blockade the enemy pawn(s) with one of the knights, maneuver the enemy king into a stalemated position, then bring the other knight over to checkmate. (See Two knights endgame.)

Three knights

Three knights and a king can force checkmate against a lone king within twenty moves (assuming that the lone king cannot quickly win a knight).  These situations are generally only seen in chess problems, since at least one of the knights must be a promoted piece, and there is rarely a reason to promote a pawn to a piece other than a queen (see Underpromotion).

See also

Notes

References

Bibliography

 

 (1981 paperback)

 

 
 

 

  

Rules of chess

Chess terminology
Chess endgames
Chess theory
Victory